Raich may refer to:

Places
 Raich, Kleines Wiesental, Lörrach, Baden-Württemberg, Germany; a village

People
Given named
 Raich Carter (1913–1994), British soccer and cricket player

Surnamed
 Abdur Raich (1931–1988), Banglasdeshi politician
 Angel Raich, wife of U.S. lawyer Robert Raich, and the defendant in SCOTUS case Gonzales/Ashcroft v. Raich [545 U.S. 1 (2005)]
 Benjamin Raich (born 1978), Austrian skier
 Carina Raich (born 1979), Austrian skier
 Eric Raich (born 1951), U.S. baseball player
 Hermann Raich (1934–2009), Roman Catholic bishop in Papua New Guinea
 Johann Michael Raich (1832–1907), Bavarian Germanic Catholic theologian
 Josep Raich (1913–1988), Catalunyan Spaniard soccer player
 Marlies Raich née Schild (born 1981), Austrian skier
 Robert Raich, a U.S. lawyer
 Semyon Raich (1792–1855; Семён Егорович Раич), Russian poet

Law
 Gonzales v. Raich or Ashcroft v. Raich [545 U.S. 1 (2005)] (aka "Raich"), a U.S. Supreme Court case about the Commerce Clause and home-grown cannabis, involving Angel Raich and Robert Raich
 Truax v Raich [239 US 33 (1915)] (aka "Raich"), a U.S. labor law case about the right to work

See also

 "The Raich", an episode of the Star Wars animated series Ewoks
 Raych Seldon, a fictional character from Isaac Asimov's Foundation Saga
 Rajch, a name of Germany
 
 Reich (disambiguation)
 Raiche (disambiguation)
 Rasche (surname)
 Rasch (surname)